What It Takes is a documentary film directed by Peter Han that follows four elite Ironman triathletes through a year of training and preparation in advance of the 2005 Ironman World Championship in Kona, Hawaii.

The film was shot digitally in native 16:9 widescreen using Panasonic AJ-SDX900 camcorders in 24 frames per second.  Filming began in November 2004 and completed in February 2006.

External links
 Official website
 

2006 films
American sports documentary films
2000s English-language films
2000s American films